Date and time notation in Pakistan is based on the Gregorian and Islamic calendars. Pakistan has not officially adopted any time and date representation standard based on the ISO 8601.

Date
Government documents and transactions use "DD/MM/YYYY" format when writing in English, Urdu or in Pakistan's regional languages; examples of this can be found on the Pakistani passport application form, the National Identity Card or the Pakistan Origin Card.

Days of the week

Months of the year

Time

In terms of time usage, both the 24-hour clock and 12-hour clock are widely used in the country. The 12-hour notation is widely used in daily life, written communication, and is used in spoken language. The 24-hour notation is used in situations where there would be widespread ambiguity. Examples include railway timetables, plane departure and landing timings, and TV schedules.

References

Time in Pakistan
Pakistan